Ignatyevo is a rural locality (a selo) in Chigirinsky Selsoviet of Blagoveshchensky District, Amur Oblast, Russia. The population was 1,011 as of 2018. There are 27 streets.

Geography 
Ignatyevo is located 27 km north of Blagoveshchensk (the district's administrative centre) by road. Kanton-Kommuna is the nearest rural locality.

References 

Rural localities in Blagoveshchensky District, Amur Oblast